The Man Hunter is a 1930 American pre-Code all-talking adventure drama that stars Rin Tin Tin. The film was released by Warner Brothers, and was adapted by James A. Starr (who wrote the screenplay and dialogue) from a story by Lillie Hayward who also wrote the screenplay.

Plot
Lady Jane Winston (Lane), heiress to a company called the West Africa Ivory and Rubber Co., travels to Africa because she believes that George Castle (Loder), the company's manager in Africa, is stealing from the company. Rin Tin Tin sails on the same ship that she does.

When the ships arrives near Africa, Rin Tin Tin jumps overboard and swims ashore. When Rin Tin Tin arrives on the beach he befriends Jim Clayton (Delaney), a former employee of Winston's company. As she is above to get off the ship, Winston falls into the water, as some ferocious sharks appear. Clayton and Rin Tin Tin rescue her and they become friends. They decide to help Winston entrap Castle. When Clayton discovers a cache of ivory that Castle had hidden he is surprised by Castle's men and imprisoned.

Luckily, Clayton manages to give Rin Tin Tin a message who delivers it to Winston. When Winston attempts to help Clayton escape, Castle kidnaps her as well. In order to escape arrest by the authorities, Castle than inspires the natives to revolt against the whites. Rin Tin Tin manages to get to a British outpost just in time and the British soldiers quickly restore order, arrest Castle, and free Winston and Clayton.

Cast
Rin Tin Tin as Rinty
Nora Lane as Lady Jane Winston
Charles Delaney as Jim Clayton
John Loder as George Castle
Pat Hartigan as Crosby
Floyd Shackelford as Simba
Billy Bletcher as Buggs
Joe Bordeaux as Dennis
John Kelly as Charlie

Box Office
According to Warner Bros records the film earned $108,000 domestically and $34,000 foreign.

Preservation
The film is believed to be a lost film.

See also
List of lost films

References

External links
 

1930 films
1930s adventure drama films
American black-and-white films
1930s English-language films
Films directed by D. Ross Lederman
Lost American films
Warner Bros. films
American adventure drama films
Rin Tin Tin
1930 drama films
1930s American films